Maurice Patrick McTigue  (born 1940, in Methven) is a former New Zealand politician of the National Party. He was a Cabinet Minister in the Fourth National Government from 1990 to 1993, holding the Employment portfolio, among others. He represented the Timaru electorate in Parliament from 1985, when he won the by-election after the death of Sir Basil Arthur, having stood against him in the 1984 general election. He lost the seat to Jim Sutton in the 1993 general election.

From 1994 to 1997 he was the High Commissioner to Canada. McTigue joined the Mercatus Center at George Mason University in 1997 as a distinguished visiting scholar. McTigue is currently J.M. Bemis Chair in Accountability Studies and Vice President of the Mercatus Center.

Member of Parliament

McTigue entered the New Zealand Parliament in 1985 and served as the National Party's Junior Whip.  He also served as National's spokesperson for Works, Irrigation, Transport and Fisheries.

Minister of Employment & Associate Minister of Finance
In 1990, McTigue was appointed Minister of Employment and Associate Minister of Finance, holding primary financial responsibility for student loans, school funding, public transit, occupational licensing, and the restructuring of employment programs.

Other minister positions & Chairmanship of Expenditure Control Committee
In 1991, McTigue accepted the positions of Minister of State Owned Enterprises, Minister of Railways, and Minister of Works and Development, and assumed Chairmanship of the Cabinet's powerful Expenditure Control Committee.

Minister of Labour and Minister of Immigration
In 1993, McTigue was appointed Minister of Labour and Minister of Immigration.

High Commissioner to Canada
In April 1994, he moved to Canada as New Zealand's High Commissioner; concurrently, he served as non-resident High Commissioner to Jamaica, Barbados, Trinidad and Tobago, and Guyana. An amateur magician, whilst in Canada he co-founded the Ottawa Magicians Guild.

In the 1998 Queen's Birthday Honours, McTigue was appointed a Companion of the Queen's Service Order for public services.

Mercatus Center
McTigue is director of the Government Accountability Project at the Mercatus Center at George Mason University. In 2003, he was appointed to the Office of Personnel Management Senior Review Committee, formed to make recommendations for new Human Resources systems at the then newly created Department of Homeland Security.

References

 1990 Parliamentary Candidates for the New Zealand National Party by John Stringer (New Zealand National Party, 1990)

External links
 Maurice McTigue's Mercatus Center Profile Page
 

1940 births
Living people
New Zealand National Party MPs
Members of the Cabinet of New Zealand
High Commissioners of New Zealand to Canada
High Commissioners of New Zealand to Jamaica
High Commissioners of New Zealand to Guyana
High Commissioners of New Zealand to Trinidad and Tobago
High Commissioners of New Zealand to Barbados
Unsuccessful candidates in the 1993 New Zealand general election
Unsuccessful candidates in the 1984 New Zealand general election
Members of the New Zealand House of Representatives
New Zealand MPs for South Island electorates
Companions of the Queen's Service Order
Mercatus Center
New Zealand expatriates in the United States
Immigration ministers of New Zealand
Labour ministers of New Zealand